Wilshire Boulevard is a prominent  boulevard in the Los Angeles area of Southern California, extending from Ocean Avenue in the city of Santa Monica east to Grand Avenue in the Financial District of downtown Los Angeles. One of the principal east-west arterial roads of Los Angeles, it is also one of the major city streets through the city of Beverly Hills. Wilshire Boulevard runs roughly parallel with Santa Monica Boulevard from Santa Monica to the west boundary of Beverly Hills. From the east boundary it runs a block south of Sixth Street to its terminus.

 

Wilshire Boulevard is densely developed throughout most of its span, connecting five of Los Angeles's major business districts and Beverly Hills to one-another. Many of the post-1956 skyscrapers in Los Angeles are located along Wilshire; for example, the Wilshire Grand Center, which is the tallest building in California, is located on the Figueroa and Wilshire intersection. One Wilshire, built in 1966 at the junction of Wilshire and Grand, is said to be "...the main hub of the internet for the entire Pacific Rim" due to the large concentration of telecommunications companies renting space there. Aon Center, at one point Los Angeles' largest (and presently third-largest) tower, is at 707 Wilshire Boulevard in downtown Los Angeles.

The stretch of the boulevard between Fairfax and Highland Avenues is known as the Miracle Mile. Many of Los Angeles's largest museums are amidst this concentration of cultural institutions. The area just to the east, between Highland Avenue and Wilton Place, is referred to as the "Park Mile". Between Westwood and Holmby Hills, several tall glitzy condominium buildings overlook this part of Wilshire, giving it the title of Millionaire's Mile. This section is also known as the Wilshire Corridor and Condo Canyon.

The Wilshire Corridor, located next to Century City, is one of Los Angeles's busiest districts, and contains many high-rise residential towers. The Fox and MGM studios are located in a series of skyscrapers, along with many historic Los Angeles hotels.

Wilshire Boulevard is also the principal street of Koreatown, the site of many of Los Angeles' oldest buildings and skyscrapers. Koreatown and Mid-Wilshire are among Los Angeles's most densely populated districts.

History

The Calle de los Indios
Wilshire Boulevard originated as one of the central pathways constructed by the Tongva tribes residing in the region prior to the exploration of the conquistadores.  At the time of the founding of Los Angeles, Wilshire Boulevard was one of the main arteries connecting the largest Tongva city in the area, then known as Yaanga, which eventually become Union Station, to the Pacific Ocean.  

From the founding of Los Angeles through nearly all of the 1800s, Wilshire Boulevard was known as "Calle de los Indios."

Before the Spanish settlements of Los Angeles, much of the length of Wilshire Boulevard can be traced back to the indigenous Tongva people who used it to bring back tar from the La Brea pits in today's Miracle Mile section of Wilshire Blvd, back to their settlement on the coast. This road was later used by Spanish explorers and settlers, calling it El Camino Viejo ('The Old Road'). The route that ultimately became Wilshire crossed the original pueblo of Los Angeles and five of the original Spanish land grants, or ranchos.

Wilshire was pieced together from various streets over several decades. It began in the 1870s as Nevada Avenue in Santa Monica, and in the 1880s as Orange Street between Westlake (now MacArthur) Park and downtown. Nevada and Orange were later renamed as parts of Wilshire.

As Wilshire Boulevard
In 1895, Henry Gaylord Wilshire (1861–1927), a developer, publisher, and revolutionary who made and lost fortunes in real estate, farming, and gold mining, donated land to the City of Los Angeles for a boulevard stretching westward from a tract of luxury homes he was developing in Westlake Park (today's MacArthur Park). The road first appeared on a map under its present name in 1895. A historic apartment building on the corner of Wilshire Blvd. and S. Kenmore Ave., the Gaylord, carries his middle name.

Wilshire Boulevard formerly ended at the MacArthur Park lake, but in 1934 a berm was built for it to cross and link up with the existing Orange Street (which ran from Figueroa to Alvarado) into downtown Los Angeles. Orange Street was renamed Wilshire and extended east of Figueroa to Grand. This divided the lake into two halves; the northern half was later drained.

The Wilshire Boulevard home of J. Paul Getty was used as the film set for the 1950 film Sunset Boulevard: it was demolished in 1957.

Transportation

All of the boulevard is at least four lanes in width, and most of the portion between Hoover Street and Robertson Boulevard has a raised center median. The widest portion of the boulevard is located in the business district of central Westwood, where mobs of pedestrians crossing Wilshire at Westwood Boulevard must traverse ten lanes (including two left-turn pockets). According to a 1991 study by the Los Angeles Department of Transportation, this and the nearby intersection of Wilshire and Veteran are among the busiest in Los Angeles.

LA Metro Rail
The D and B subway lines of the Los Angeles Metro run along Wilshire Boulevard from just past the 7th/Figueroa Street station before serving the Westlake/MacArthur Park and Wilshire/Vermont stations, where the D Line continues along Wilshire to serve two stations at Normandie Avenue and at Western Avenue in Koreatown, while the B Line branches off to terminate in North Hollywood.

The construction of the future Purple Line extension along Wilshire Boulevard commenced in November 2014. The construction timeline would see the project from the existing Wilshire/Western station to the planned Wilshire/La Cienega station on the corner of Wilshire and La Cienega Boulevard, to be completed by 2023. The second phase got officially under way on February 23, 2018 from Wilshire/La Cienega to Century City Station. Phase three of the Purple Line extension, when fully completed, will extend to UCLA and Westwood/VA Hospital, and will follow Wilshire Boulevard for most of its route. Phase four to downtown Santa Monica is still in the planning stages and has no funding.

LA Metro bus routes 
Metro Local Line 20, Metro Rapid Line 720, and Santa Monica Transit Line 2 operate along Wilshire Boulevard. Due to the high ridership of line 720,  NABI & New Flyer articulated buses are used on this route, and bus lanes are in place along some segments of the line.

The aging sections of Wilshire Boulevard in the city of Los Angeles are notorious for their giant potholes.

Communities from west to east
Wilshire Boulevard runs through or near the following communities:

Santa Monica (city)
Brentwood (neighborhood)
Sawtelle (neighborhood)
Westwood (neighborhood)
Beverly Hills (city)
Miracle Mile (historic stretch of the boulevard)
Carthay Circle (neighborhood) – boulevard flanks northern edge
Hancock Park (neighborhood) – boulevard flanks southern edge
Windsor Square (neighborhood) – boulevard flanks southern edge
Wilshire Park (neighborhood)
Wilshire Center (neighborhood) / Koreatown (neighborhood)
Westlake (neighborhood)
Downtown Los Angeles

Landmarks from west to east
 Santa Monica sculpture
 Los Angeles National Cemetery
 Wilshire Federal Building
 Hammer Museum
 Westwood Village Memorial Park Cemetery
 Sephardic Temple Tifereth Israel
Wilshire Regent
 Sinai Temple
 Los Angeles Country Club
 Beverly Hilton Hotel
 The Regent Beverly Wilshire Hotel
 Rodeo Drive
 Sterling Plaza
 Academy of Motion Picture Arts and Sciences
 Larry Flynt Publications
 Saban Theatre (formerly Fox Wilshire Theater)
 Johnie's Coffee Shop
 Petersen Automotive Museum
 Academy Museum of Motion Pictures
 Hancock Park
 Los Angeles County Museum of Art
 La Brea Tar Pits and George C. Page Museum
 El Rey Theatre
 E. Clem Wilson Building
 Ebell of Los Angeles
 Los Altos Apartments
 Pellissier Building and Wiltern Theatre
 Wilshire Boulevard Temple
 St. Basil Catholic Church
 Robert F. Kennedy Community Schools (former site of the Ambassador Hotel)
 Southwestern University School of Law (in the former Bullocks Wilshire department store)
 The Town House
 Lafayette Park
 Bryson Apartment Hotel
 Park Plaza Hotel
 MacArthur Park (formerly Westlake Park)
 Good Samaritan Hospital
 Wilshire Grand Tower

Major intersections

See also
 Ernest L. Webster, Los Angeles City Council member, 1927–31, helped introduce traffic-signal system
 Harold A. Henry, Los Angeles City Council president active in beautifying the boulevard

References

Further reading

Books

 Rosen, Louis (2011). Henry Gaylord Wilshire: The Millionaire Socialist. Los Angeles, CA: School Justice Institute.

External links 

 Wilshire Wonders (kcet.org)
 Curating the City: Wilshire Blvd
 An excerpt from "Wilshire Boulevard: Grand Concourse of Los Angeles", by Kevin Roderick

 
Streets in Los Angeles
Streets in Santa Monica, California
Boulevards in the United States

Economy of Los Angeles
Streets in Beverly Hills, California
Koreatown, Los Angeles
Mid-Wilshire, Los Angeles
Westwood, Los Angeles
Bus rapid transit in California
Westside (Los Angeles County)
West Los Angeles